The list of Eircode routing key areas in Ireland is a tabulation of the routing key areas used by An Post and other mail delivery services for the purposes of directing mail within Ireland. A routing key area "defines a principal post town" according to An Post. There are currently 139 routing key areas in the country. This table does not include the second part of Ireland's seven-character Eircodes, known as the "unique identifier". These are unique to individual addresses and are not street-level identifiers, as is the case in other countries. There are currently 2.2 million of these codes.

Scope

Although Ireland's routing key areas take a similar format to postcode areas in the United Kingdom (including Northern Ireland), they are not intended as a mnemonic for a county or city name, except for those used in the historic Dublin postal districts. Several towns and townlands can share the same routing key. A routing key coupled with a unique identifier looks like this:

This corresponds to the unique address of 

 Terenure Post Office
 128 Terenure Road 
 Dublin 6 West
 D6W PV38

Eircode routing areas

See also 
 Republic of Ireland postal addresses
 List of Dublin postal districts
 List of postal codes

References 

Postal codes by country